Gunnar Gravdahl (17 August 1927 – 18 April 2015) was a Norwegian politician for the Conservative Party.

He served as mayor of Bærum from 1979 to 1992. Outside politics he was a psychologist.

References
Death announcement, Aftenposten 22 April 2015 p. 37

1927 births
2015 deaths
Conservative Party (Norway) politicians
Mayors of places in Akershus
Bærum politicians